An election address is the material sent out by a candidate during a political campaign.  Election Addresses are normally only sent out during the election period itself.  Other political leaflets are usually known by different names.

In UK parliamentary elections, all candidates are entitled to have one election address delivered free, by Royal Mail to every voter in their constituency.

External links
 Election addresses Collection of election addresses of almost all of the candidates at every British General Election since 1892.  University of Bristol Library Special Collections

Elections